Drelsdorf (North Frisian: Trölstrup) is a municipality in the district of Nordfriesland, in Schleswig-Holstein, Germany. Drelsdorf is home to the last remaining speakers of the Central Goesharde Frisian dialect of North Frisian.

References

Nordfriesland